Hedwigiaceae is a family of mosses belonging to the order Hedwigiales.

Genera:
 Braunia Bruch & Schimp.
 Bryowijkia
 Hedwigia P.Beauv.
 Hedwigidium Bruch & Schimp.
 Pararhacocarpus Frahm
 Pseudobraunia (Lesq. & James) Broth.
 Rhacocarpus Lindb.

References

Bryopsida
Moss families